The United Kingdom, where the Industrial Revolution began in the late 18th century, has a long history of manufacturing, which contributed to Britain's early economic growth. During the second half of the 20th century, there was a steady decline in the importance of manufacturing and the economy of the United Kingdom shifted toward services. Manufacturing, however, remains important for overseas trade and accounted for 44% of goods exports in 2014. In June 2010, manufacturing in the United Kingdom accounted for 8.2% of the workforce and 12% of the country's national output. The East Midlands and West Midlands (at 12.6 and 11.8% respectively) were the regions with the highest proportion of employees in manufacturing. London had the lowest at 2.8%.

History
Manufacturing in the United Kingdom expanded on an unprecedented scale in the 19th century. Innovation in Britain led to revolutionary changes in manufacturing, the development of factory systems, and growth of transportation by railway and steam ship that spread around the world. Its growth was driven by international trading relationships Britain developed with Asia, Europe and the Americas, as well as entrepreneurialism, work ethic and the availability of natural resources such as coal. The main sectors were textiles, iron and steel making, engineering, and later ship building. Between 1809 and 1839, exports tripled from £25 million to £76 million, while imports nearly doubled from £28 million to £52 million during the same period; by 1849, exports were £124 million and imports were £79 million. In many industrial sectors, Britain was the largest manufacturer in the world and the most technologically advanced.

In the later part of the 19th century, a second phase developed which is sometimes known as the Second Industrial Revolution. Germany and later the United States, which made use of the American system of manufacturing, caught up and overtook Britain as the world's largest manufacturers in the early 20th century. Nonetheless, Britain remained one of the largest industrial producers. By the middle of the century, in 1948, manufacturing (including utilities and oil and gas extraction) made up 48% of the UK economy. In the post-war decades, manufacturing began to lose its competitive advantage and heavy industry experienced a relative decline. By 2013, the percentage of manufacturing in the economy (including utilities and oil and gas extraction) had fallen to 13%, replaced by services which had risen from 46% to 79% over the same period.

The trend of deindustrialisation in the United Kingdom is common to all mature Western economies. Heavy industry, employing many thousands of people and producing large volumes of low-value goods (such as steelmaking) has either become highly efficient (producing the same amount of output from fewer manufacturing sites employing fewer people; for example, productivity in the UK's steel industry increased by a factor of 8 between 1978 and 2006) or has been replaced by smaller industrial units producing high-value goods (such as the aerospace and electronics industries).

How the manufacturing sector is accounted for has however changed as part of manufacturing companies providing services and for those supplying it, so the actual size of the sector will vary in size according to the criteria in question.

Recent trends

Although the manufacturing sector's share of both employment and the UK's GDP has steadily fallen since the 1960s, data from the OECD shows that manufacturing output has steadily increased in terms of both production and value since 1945. A 2009 report from PricewaterhouseCoopers, citing data from the UK Office for National Statistics, stated that manufacturing output (gross value added at 2007 prices) has increased in 35 of the 50 years between 1958 and 2007, and output in 2007 was at record levels, approximately double that in 1958.

Manufacturing employment has fallen faster in the UK since 1998. This started with manufacturing productivity flatlining from 1993 to 1997 and a rise in pound sterling. PricewaterhouseCoopers presumed that British manufacturing was less able to adapt to new production immune from Asian competition. Since 1993, the UK has also invested less in R&D and adaptation than its OECD competitors. However, manufacturing remains an important sector of the modern British economy and the UK is one of the most attractive countries in the world for direct foreign industrial investment in 2003.

Yet, the manufacturing sector was worth £393 billion or $514 billion in the United Kingdom, according to office of national statistics.com.

Manufacturing has recently been rising in the UK with increased domestic demand with a fall in the pound too. The UK leaving the EU could lead to increased opportunity for access to cheaper raw materials from Africa and South America. More firms returning their production to the UK have also bucked the trend.

Engineering 

Engineering and allied industries comprise the single largest sector, contributing 30.8% of total Gross Value Added in manufacturing in 2003. Within this sector, transport equipment was the largest contributor, with 7 global car manufacturers being present in the UK. These include British makers now owned by overseas companies such MINI (BMW), Rolls-Royce (BMW), Jaguar Land Rover (Tata), Bentley (Volkswagen)  and Vauxhall Motors (Stellantis) and plants making vehicles under foreign ownership and branding such as Nissan and Toyota with a number of smaller, specialist manufacturers including Aston Martin, Lotus and Morgan and commercial vehicle manufacturers including Leyland Trucks, Alexander Dennis, JCB, London Electric Vehicle Company and Case-New Holland also being present. The British motor industry also comprises numerous components for the sector, such as Ford's diesel engine plant in Dagenham, which produces half of Ford's diesel engines globally.
 Triumph Motorcycles Ltd is the only wholly British owned major transport manufacturer.

A range of international companies like Alstom, Hitachi, CAF and Siemens manufacture railway locomotives and other related components. Associated with this sector are the aerospace and defence equipment industries. The UK manufactures a broad range of equipment, with the sector being dominated by BAE Systems, one of the world's largest arms manufacturers, which serves the civil and defence aerospace, land and marine equipment market; Babcock International, a similarly diversified defense conglomerate; and GKN and Rolls-Royce, who manufacture aerospace engines and power generation systems. The commercial maritime sector, meanwhile, still includes historic names such as Harland and Wolff, Cammell Laird, and A&P Group. Companies such as Princess, Sealine, Fairline Boats and Sunseeker are major builders of private motor yachts.

Another important component of engineering and allied industries is electronics, audio and optical equipment, with the UK having a broad base of domestic firms, alongside a number of foreign firms manufacturing a wide range of TV, radio and communications products, scientific and optical instruments, electrical machinery and office machinery and computers.

Chemicals and chemical-based products are another important contributor to the UK's manufacturing base. Within this sector, the pharmaceutical industry is particularly successful, with the world's second and seventh largest pharmaceutical firms (GlaxoSmithKline and AstraZeneca respectively) being based in the UK and having major research and development and manufacturing facilities there.

Other sectors 
Other important sectors of the manufacturing industry include food, drink, tobacco, paper, printing, publishing and textiles. Examples of major companies in these industries are Diageo, Unilever, Cadbury, Tate & Lyle, British American Tobacco, Imperial Tobacco, HarperCollins, and Reed Elsevier.

See also
Economic history of the United Kingdom
Nationalization (UK)
Science and technology in the United Kingdom
Manufacturing in Wales

References

External links

"UK manufacturers provide a strong foundation for growth in the UK" EEF (2017)
Hennik Research. Annual Manufacturing Report: 2017 (Dec. 2016)
 : Annual event, National Manufacturing Debate, held at Cranfield University. 2013 topic "National Strategy for UK Manufacturing"
 Certified Made in the UK design and manufacturing organisation.